Gerald R. Kill (born August 24, 1961) is an American football coach. He is currently the head coach at New Mexico State University. He played college football at Southwestern College in Winfield, Kansas from 1979 to 1982. Kill served as the head coach at Saginaw Valley State University, Emporia State University, Southern Illinois University Carbondale, Northern Illinois University and the University of Minnesota, as well as serving as the interim head coach for the final 4 games of the 2021 season at TCU.

Kill has also served as an athletic department administrator, most recently at Southern Illinois University as an assistant to the Chancellor and athletic director. He was also briefly at Kansas State as associate athletic director.

During the course of his career he was credited with bringing several programs to new heights and these successes led to increasingly more prestigious coaching positions. Despite retiring from the game in 2015 due to health reasons, Kill returned to coaching in 2020 after accepting a special assistant's job at TCU and was named the interim head coach on October 31, 2021 after the resignation of Gary Patterson.

Early life and playing career
Kill was born in Cheney, Kansas. He was raised in a working-class family and became the first member of his family to graduate from college.

Coaching career

Saginaw Valley State
Kill landed his first college head coaching job as the fourth football coach at Saginaw Valley State University in 1994, where he produced five consecutive winning seasons, including back-to-back 9–2 campaigns in 1997 and 1998. Kill compiled a 38–14 record in five years as head coach. His teams led the NCAA's Division II in rushing each of his last two years and his last season was second in the nation in total offense (498.3) and scoring (42.5).

He is ranked third at Saginaw Valley State in total wins and second in winning percentage (as of the 2007 season).

Emporia State
Kill was the 20th head football coach for Emporia State University in Emporia, Kansas, and held that position for two seasons, from 1999 until 2000. His overall coaching record at Emporia State was 11–11.  As of completion of the 2007 season, this ranked him tenth at Emporia State in total wins and ninth in winning percentage.

Southern Illinois
Kill was named to the head coaching post at Southern Illinois University Carbondale in 2001. In 2004, Kill's Salukis went a perfect 9–0 against Division I-AA opponents and outscored competitors by more than 30 points per game. Southern Illinois finished 7–0 in Gateway Football Conference games, earned the No. 1 ranking for the final ten weeks of the year, and garnered the top seed in the 2004 postseason.

At Southern Illinois, Kill was the first coach to produce four consecutive winning seasons and is credited with turning the football team around to a winning program. On September 26, 2006, he became the school's all-time leader in winning percentage after defeating Indiana State, 55–3.

Northern Illinois
In December 2007, Northern Illinois University in DeKalb, announced that Kill had been hired as its new head coach. He replaced Joe Novak, who retired after developing the Huskies into a successful program over 12 seasons, though just one bowl win. Before Kill's first season at Northern Illinois began, NIU was ranked No. 6 in ESPN's Bottom 10.  The team finished the 2008 regular season with a 6–6 record. The six wins secured bowl eligibility and an invitation to the Independence Bowl was accepted.  Northern Illinois was defeated by Louisiana Tech, 17–10, in the bowl game despite outgaining the Bulldogs in rushing and passing yardage.

In 2010, Northern Illinois had a nine-game win streak and reached the MAC Championship Game, losing to Miami.  NIU finished 10–3 for the year. In December, days after the losing the conference championship to Miami, Kill accepted the position of head coach for the Minnesota Golden Gophers.  His announcement came less than two weeks before the Huskies were scheduled to play in the Humanitarian Bowl.  Leaving the team in the manner he did (many teammates learned about his new job via Twitter instead of from Kill himself) dealt an emotional blow to the members of the team; quarterback Chandler Harnish saying about Kill's departure, "I have a horrible taste in my mouth".  Additionally, besides the emotional impact, USA Today noted, "The timing of the announcement further hurts the program due to Kill most likely taking the bulk of his staff to Minnesota."

Thus, Kill left NIU without ever winning a bowl game.  Furthermore, the fact that Kill left NIU before the team's bowl game added fuel to the debate about whether or not the NCAA should prohibit coaches from abandoning their teams before their final bowl game.

Minnesota
The University of Minnesota hired Jerry Kill on December 6, 2010. He took over for Tim Brewster who was fired during the middle of the season. Kill brought much of his NIU staff with him to Minnesota, including offensive coordinator Matt Limegrover, defensive coordinator Tracy Claeys, and special teams coordinator Jay Sawvel. While his first season in Minnesota was not particularly successful (finishing with a 3–9 record and one of only two non-bowl eligible teams in the Big Ten), Kill was in the headlines most often due to his health issues. A highlight of the 2011 season was a win over Big Ten rival Iowa. In Kill's second season (2012), Minnesota improved to 6–7, including an appearance in the Meineke Car Care of Texas Bowl where they eventually lost a close game to Texas Tech 34–31.

After Kill led Minnesota to a 4–1 start in the 2013 season, a seizure prevented him from attending Minnesota's game at Michigan. He announced on October 10, 2013 that he would take a leave of absence to focus on epilepsy treatment. With his longtime defensive coordinator Tracy Claeys serving as acting head coach, Kill watched their next game, a win over Northwestern, from the press box. Minnesota went on to win four consecutive Big Ten games for the first time since 1973. Even without Kill present on the field, the Gophers finished with an 8–5 record. The American Football Association named Kill the Region 3 Coach of the Year.

Kill returned to the field for the 2014 football season. For the first six games of the season, the Golden Gophers went 5–1, with their only loss to TCU (30–7), and conference wins over Michigan (30–14) and Northwestern (24–17). The team ended with an 8–5 record, with losses to TCU, Illinois (28–24), Ohio State (31–24), Wisconsin (34–24), and Mizzou (33–17) at the Citrus Bowl. Kill was also awarded the Big Ten Coach of the Year award for the 2014 season.

Jerry Kill began the 2015 season with the Gophers, building a 4–3 record. However, worsening health problems led him to retire from his position as head coach on October 28, 2015. He was succeeded by defensive coordinator Tracy Claeys.

Southern Illinois AD
Kill returned to Southern Illinois in 2018 as a special assistant to the chancellor, later becoming athletic director. He remained in that role through September 2019, when he returned to the coaching ranks at Virginia Tech.

Virginia Tech
Kill was tapped by Virginia Tech head football coach Justin Fuente to be his special assistant after three games of the 2019 football season.

TCU
TCU head coach Gary Patterson hired Kill away from Virginia Tech in January 2020 to be a special assistant, overseeing the offense. Although close friends, the two had never worked together before. Kill took over as interim head coach midway through the 2021 season after TCU and Patterson parted ways.

New Mexico State

On November 24, 2021, it was reported that Kill would be the next head coach at New Mexico State University following the 2021 season.
In his first season, the Aggies won their 2nd bowl game since 1960 and finished 7-6.

Personal life, health issues, and charity work
Jerry Kill is married to Rebecca Kill, and they have two daughters, Krystal and Tasha.

Kill is a close friend of Gary Patterson, former head football coach at Texas Christian University.  Both men played football for Dennis Franchione and each worked for him as an assistant coach.  Kill served as the best man in Patterson's wedding.

Kill suffered a seizure toward the end of a game in October 2005. Subsequently, Kill was diagnosed with kidney cancer, which is now in remission. Kill has since started the Coach Kill Fund to assist low-income southern Illinois residents with treatment. Then, from 2010 through 2013, Kill was plagued by a series of gameday hospitalizations, most of which were also seizures. Shortly after a game in September 2010, he was hospitalized for dehydration. He then suffered two gameday seizures during the 2011 season, followed by one each in 2012 and 2013. After the 2013 seizure, Kill announced that he was taking a leave of absence to address his health and get his seizures under control. After coaching for the entire 2014 season and the first seven games of the 2015 season, Kill announced that he was resigning as head coach on October 28, 2015. He cited health reasons, including at least two additional seizures, as the cause for his decision.

Kill was a nominee for the 2011 Uplifting Athletes Rare Disease Champion Award, presented by Uplifting Athletes, but lost to Princeton running back Jordan Culbreath.  In 2016, he was named to the Kansas Sports Hall of Fame.

Head coaching record

References

External links
 New Mexico State profile
 Northern Illinois profile

1961 births
Living people
American football linebackers
Emporia State Hornets football coaches
High school football coaches in Missouri
Minnesota Golden Gophers football coaches
New Mexico State Aggies football coaches
Northern Illinois Huskies football coaches
Pittsburg State Gorillas football coaches
Rutgers Scarlet Knights football coaches
Saginaw Valley State Cardinals football coaches
Southern Illinois Salukis athletic directors
Southern Illinois Salukis football coaches
Southwestern Moundbuilders football players
TCU Horned Frogs football coaches
People from Sedgwick County, Kansas
Coaches of American football from Kansas
Players of American football from Kansas